Present television personalities on the ESPN network.

Current ESPN personalities

Analysts
 Troy Aikman (2022-present): Monday Night Football
 Eric Allen (2002–present): NFL Live
 Teddy Atlas (1998–present): Friday Night Fights
 Jon Barry (2006–present): NBA on ESPN
 Jay Bilas (1995–present): College GameDay (basketball) and College Basketball on ESPN
 Todd Blackledge (2006–present): ESPN College Football Saturday Primetime
 Brian Boucher (2021-present): NHL on ESPN
 Aaron Boulding (2005–present): video game 
 Hubie Brown: (2005–present) NBA on ABC and NBA on ESPN
 Ryan Callahan (2021-present): NHL on ESPN
 Cassie Campbell-Pascall (2021-present): NHL on ESPN
 Chris Chelios (2021-present): NHL on ESPN
 Lee Corso (1987–present): College GameDay (football)
 Rick DiPietro (2021-present): NHL on ESPN
 Ray Ferraro (2002-2004, 2021-present): NHL on ESPN
 Fran Fraschilla (2004–present): College Basketball on ESPN
 Rod Gilmore: ESPN2 College Football Friday Primetime
 Mike Golic (1995–2020): Golic and Wingo
 Scott Goodyear (2001–present): IndyCar Series
 Tim Hasselbeck (2008–present): NFL Live
 Kirk Herbstreit (1995–present): College GameDay (football) and Saturday Night Football
 Desmond Howard (2005–present): College GameDay (football)
 Quint Kessenich (2005–present): lacrosse and ESPN College Football and College Basketball on ESPN
 Mel Kiper, Jr. (1984–present): NFL Draft and scouting
 Hilary Knight (2021-present): NHL on ESPN
 Tim Kurkjian (1998–present): Baseball Tonight
 Tim Legler (2000–present): NBA on ESPN, NBA Shootaround and NBA Fastbreak
 Trevor Matich: ESPN College Football
 Mark May: ESPN College Football
 Lon McEachern (1994–present): poker
 Greg McElroy (2015–present): ESPN College Football
 Patrick McEnroe (1995–present): tennis
 Steve McManaman (2010–present): soccer
 Todd McShay: ESPN College Football and NFL Draft scouting
 Barry Melrose (1995-2008, 2009–present): NHL on ESPN
 Mark Messier (2021-present): NHL on ESPN
 A. J. Mleczko (2021-present): NHL on ESPN
 Dominic Moore (2021-present): NHL on ESPN
 Chris Mortensen: Sunday NFL Countdown and Monday Night Countdown
 David Norrie: College Football on ABC and ESPN College Football
 Andy North (2004–present): golf
 Buster Olney (2003–present): Baseball Tonight
 Jesse Palmer: College Football on ABC and ESPN College Football Thursday Primetime
 Jeff Passan (2019—present): MLB
 David Pollack: ESPNU College Football and College GameDay (football)
 Derek Rae (1994–present): Champions League coverage
 Jordan Rodgers (2016–present): ESPN College Football
 Jalen Rose (2007–present): NBA on ESPN
 Adam Schefter 2009–present: NFL programming
 Mark Schlereth (2002–2017): NFL Live
 Chris Singleton: Baseball Tonight and Monday Night Baseball
 Michael Smith (2003–present): Around the Horn, NFL Live, and E:60
 Matt Stinchcomb: ESPNU College Football
 John Tortorella (2021–present): NHL on ESPN
 Bob Valvano: ESPN College Basketball
 Jeff Van Gundy: NBA on ESPN
 Fernando Viña: Baseball Tonight
 Dick Vitale (1982–present): ESPN College Basketball
 Jay Walker: ESPNU College Football
 Andre Ware: ESPN College Football
 Kevin Weekes (2021-present): NHL on ESPN
 Jay Williams: ESPN College Basketball
 Damien Woody: (2011–present): NFL Live

Anchors
 John Anderson: 1999–present (SportsCenter)
 Victoria Arlen: 2021–present (SportsCenter)
 Ashley Brewer: 2020-present (SportsCenter, The Replay)

 Nicole Briscoe: 2008–present (SportsCenter host)
 John Buccigross: 1996–present (Baseball Tonight, ESPNews, NHL 2Night,  SportsCenter, In The Crease, and The Point)
 Linda Cohn: 1992–present (SportsCenter, X Center, and In The Crease)
 Antonietta Collins: 2016–present (SportsCenter)
 Shae Peppler Cornette: 2022–present (SportsCenter)
 Kevin Connors: 2008–present (ESPNews, College Football Live and NFL Live)
 Brian Custer 2021–present (SportsCenter)
 Rece Davis: 1994–present (SportsCenter, College Football Live, College GameNight and College GameDay)
 Elle Duncan: 2016–present (SportsCenter)
 Neil Everett: 2000–present (SportsCenter)
 Chris Fowler: 1986–present (College GameDay) and Tennis
 Mike Greenberg: 1996–present (SportsCenter and Mike & Mike in the Morning)
 Jay Harris: 2003–present (ESPNews and SportsCenter)
 Mark Jones: 1990–present (college basketball, women's basketball and American football coverage)
 Jen Lada: 2015–present (SportsCenter)
 Steve Levy: 1993–present (SportsCenter and NHL on ESPN)
 Chris McKendry: 1996–present (SportsCenter and ESPNews)
 Sarina Morales: 2015–present (SportsCenter)
 Arda Ocal: 2016-present (SportsCenter, The Point, and In The Crease)
 Karl Ravech: 1993–present (Baseball Tonight and SportsCenter)
 Tony Reali: 2000–present (Pardon the Interruption and host of Around the Horn)
 Kelsey Riggs: 2021–present (SportsCenter)
 Dianna Russini: 2015–present (SportsCenter)
 Prim Siripipat: 2011–present
 Sage Steele: 2007–present (SportsCenter and ESPN First Take)
 Hannah Storm: 2008–present (NBA Countdown, SportsCenter)

Commentators
 J.A. Adande: 2003–present (Around the Horn)
 Jim Armstrong: 2004–present (Around the Horn)
 Kevin Blackistone: 2003–present (Around the Horn)
 Bomani Jones: 2014–present (Highly Questionable)
 Norman Chad: 2003–present (World Series of Poker)
 Tim Cowlishaw: 2002–present (Around the Horn and NASCAR Now)
 Israel Gutierrez: 2008–present (Around the Horn and First Take)
 Max Kellerman: (co-host of SportsNation)
Mina Kimes: 2014–present (Around the Horn)
 Tony Kornheiser: 1997–present (co-host of Pardon the Interruption, and formerly Monday Night Football)
 Jackie MacMullan: 2003–present (Around the Horn)
 Woody Paige: 2003–present (Around the Horn, Cold Pizza and 1st and 10)
 Bill Plaschke: 2003–present (Around the Horn)
 Bob Ryan: 1993–present (The Sports Reporters and Around the Horn)
 Stephen A. Smith: 2003–present (ESPN First Take), (NBA Shootaround and formerly (Quite Frankly with Stephen A. Smith)
 Sarah Spain: 2016–present (Around the Horn)
 Michael Wilbon: 2001–present (co-host of Pardon the Interruption, and ESPN on ABC's NBA Countdown)
 Marcellus Wiley: 2007–2018 (co-host of SportsNation)

Play-by-play
 Mike Breen: 2003–present (NBA coverage)
 Joe Buck: 2022-present Monday Night Football
 Brian Custer: 2021–present (ESPN CFB, ESPN College Basketball & NBA on ESPN)
 Ian Darke: 2010–present (Major League Soccer and World Cup coverage)
 Dan Shulman: 1995–present (MLB and college basketball play-by-play announcer)
 Joe Tessitore: 2003–present (boxing and college football coverage)
 Bob Wischusen: 2006–present (college football, college basketball, and NHL)

Reporters
 Shaun Assael: 2003–present (Outside the Lines reporter, E:60 reporter)
 Bonnie Bernstein: 1995–1998, 2006–present (SportsCenter correspondent, Wednesday Night Baseball, College Football, NFL, substitute host for NFL Live and Jim Rome is Burning, co-host The Michael Kay Show on 1050 ESPN Radio, New York)
 Georgie Bingham 2007–present (co-host of SportsCenter for ESPN non-domestic market and Soccernet SportsCenter)
 Chris Connelly: 2001–present (SportsCenter reporter)
 Jeff Darlington: 2016–present (SportsCenter NFL reporter)
 Dan Graziano: 2011–present (NFL Live, SportsCenter, GetUp)
 Tina Dixon: 2006–present (college football coverage)
 Jeannine Edwards: 1995–present (primary horse racing reporter)
 Gary Gerould 1980–present (NHRA coverage)
 Bob Holtzman: 2000–present (SportsCenter reporter)
 Suzy Kolber: 1993–1996 and 1999–present (Monday Night Football and SportsCenter)
 Katie Nolan: 2017–Present (Sports? with Katie Nolan Podcast)
 Wendi Nix: 2006–present (SportsCenter reporter, college football coverage)
 Sal Paolantonio: 1995–present (SportsCenter reporter)
 Tom Rinaldi: 2003–2020 (SportsCenter reporter)
 Holly Rowe: 1998–present (college football sideline reporter, women's college basketball play-by-play)
 Lisa Salters: 2000–present (SportsCenter reporter, Monday Night Football sideline reporter)
 Jeremy Schaap: 1996–present (Outside the Lines host; SportsCenter and E:60 reporter)
 Shelley Smith: 1997–present (SportsCenter reporter)
 Tommy Smyth: 1993–present (Champions League and Major League Soccer coverage)
 Sarah Spain: 2014–present (SportsCenter reporter)
 Michele Steele: 2011–present (SportsCenter reporter)
 Marc Stein: 2002–present (NBA Fastbreak)
 Rick Sutcliffe: 2002–present (MLB coverage)
 Gary Thorne: 1992–present (play-by-play announcer for various events)
 Scott Van Pelt: 2001–present (SportsCenter and golf coverage)
 Stan Verrett: 2000–present (SportsCenter)
 Pam Ward: 1996–present (college football and women's basketball coverage)
 Michael Wilbon: 2001–present (co-host of Pardon the Interruption)
 Trey Wingo: 1997–2020 (SportsCenter and NFL Live)
 Gene Wojciechowski: 1992–present (ESPN.com)
 Darren Woodson: 2005–present (NFL Live)
 Eric Wynalda: 2003–present (MLS and World Cup)
 Katie George: 2019–present (college football sideline reporter, ACC Network)

Past ESPN personalities

See also
 List of ESPNews personalities
 List of ESPNU personalities
 List of ESPN Radio personalities

References

 
ESPN